Brand-new idol Society 2 is the fourth album by Japanese idol group BiS released through the independent label Tsubasa Records on November 16, 2016. The album is the first physical release by the group after their reformation in 2016, and features a brand-new lineup of members. The album consists of re-recorded versions of tracks from the group's independent label days, together with five new songs. An early version of the song "BiSBiS" featuring only Pour Lui was released as a free download on July 8, 2016, the day the group's reformation was announced. The album version of the track has been re-recorded with the new members. All of the album's tracks were released on Soundcloud prior to the album's release, with the exception of "CHANGE the WORLD" which was released as a music video on YouTube.

Track listing

Personnel
BiS
Pour Lui – vocals; Lyrics on Tracks 1, 5 and 10
Aya Eightprince – vocals; lyrics on Track 8
Peri Ubu – vocals
Kika Front Frontale – vocals
Go Zeela – vocals

Notes
All writing, arrangement and personnel credits taken from the album insert.

References

2016 albums
Bis (Japanese idol group) albums